A National Prize for Literature is a kind of award offered by various countries.

Examples include:

 National Prize for Literature (Argentina)
 National Literary Awards, Burma
 National Prize for Literature (Chile)
 Premio Nacional de Literatura (Costa Rica)
 National Prize for Literature (Cuba)
 National Prize for Literature (Dominica)
 Guatemala National Prize in Literature
 National Prize for Literature (Paraguay)
 National Prize for Literature (Spain)
 National Prize for Literature (Mexico) (Premio Nacional de Lingüística y Literatura) - see National Prize of Arts and Sciences (Mexico)
 National Prize for Literature (Venezuela)
 National Prize for Literature (Galicia)